The 2014 European Cup Winter Throwing was held on 16 and 17 March at the Centro Nacional de Lançamentos (National Throws Centre) and Estádio Municipal in Leiria, Portugal. It was the fourteenth edition of the athletics competition for throwing events and was jointly organised by the European Athletic Association and the Federação Portuguesa de Atletismo. The competition featured men's and women's contests in shot put, discus throw, javelin throw and hammer throw. In addition to the senior competitions, there were also under-23 events for younger athletes. 

One world-leading mark came in the senior section in the form of Aleksandr Lesnoy's  in the shot put. Two national records were improved during the two-day event: Dejan Mileusnic had a men's javelin Bosnian and Herzegovinian record with his first round throw of  while Androniki Lada twice improved the Cypriot record in the discus, throwing  then .

The under-23 section had several performers beat the standards set in the senior competitions. Montenegro's Danijel Furtula was the under-23 men's discus winner for a third year running.

Russia and Germany were the best in the team competitions, with the former winning the senior and under-23 men's titles and the latter taking both women's team titles.

Leiria was chosen as the host at the European Athletics Executive Board meeting in Lausanne on 17 September 2013.

During the competition the results were provided on a live mode, using Lap2Go technology

Medal summary

Men

Women

Under-23 men

Under-23 women

Team points table

References

Results
Results. European Athletics. Retrieved on 2014-03-26.
14th European Cup Winter Throwing, Estadio Municipal Dr. Magalhães Pessoa. Tilastopaja. Retrieved on 2014-03-26.
Tech provider. Retrieved on 2016-01-01

External links
Official website

European Throwing Cup
European Cup Winter Throwing
Winter Throwing
International athletics competitions hosted by Portugal
Sport in Leiria